Asaccus is a genus of geckos, commonly known as Southwest Asian leaf-toed geckos, in the family Phyllodactylidae.

Geographic range
The genus Asaccus is endemic to the Middle East.

Species
There are 19 species which are recognized as being valid in the genus Asaccus. Five were described in 2011.

Asaccus andersoni 
Asaccus arnoldi 
Asaccus barani 
Asaccus caudivolvulus  – Emirati leaf-toed gecko
Asaccus elisae  – Werner's leaf-toed gecko, Elisa's leaf-toed gecko
Asaccus gallagheri  – Gallagher's leaf-toed gecko, Gallagher's gecko
Asaccus gardneri  
Asaccus granularis 
Asaccus griseonotus  – grey-spotted leaf-toed gecko, grey-marked gecko
Asaccus iranicus 
Asaccus kermanshahensis  – Kermanshah leaf-toed gecko
Asaccus kurdistanensis  - Kurdistan leaf-toed gecko
Asaccus margaritae  - Margarita's leaf-toed gecko
Asaccus montanus  - mountain leaf-toed gecko
Asaccus nasrullahi  - Nasrullah's leaf-toed gecko
Asaccus platyrhynchus  - flat-snouted leaf-toed gecko 
Asaccus saffinae 
Asaccus tangestanensis 
Asaccus zagrosicus 

Nota bene: A binomial authority in parentheses indicates that the species was originally described in a genus other than Asaccus.

References

Further reading
Dixon JR, Anderson SC (1973). "A new genus and species of Gecko (Sauria: Gekkonidae) from Iran and Iraq". Bull. Southern California Acad. Sci. 72 (3): 155-160. (Asaccus, new genus, pp. 156–157; A. griseonotus, new species, pp. 158–160).

 
Reptiles of the Middle East
Lizard genera